Ephialtes (Ephialtēs) was an ancient Athenian politician and an early leader of the democratic movement there.  In the late 460s BC, he oversaw reforms that diminished the power of the Areopagus, a traditional bastion of conservatism, and which are considered by many modern historians to mark the beginning of the radical democracy for which Athens would become famous. These powers included the scrutiny and control of office holders, and the judicial functions in state trials. He introduced pay for public officeholders, reduced the property qualifications for holding a public office, and created a new definition of citizenship.  Ephialtes, however, would not live to participate in this new form of government for long. In 461 BC, he was assassinated, probably at the instigation of resentful oligarchs, and the political leadership of Athens passed to his deputy, Pericles.

Early actions
Ephialtes first appears in the historical record as the strategos commanding an Athenian fleet in the Aegean sea in 465 BC.  Then, in 464 BC, an earthquake hit Sparta, causing a great deal of damage and indirectly resulting in the revolt of the helots. When the Spartans failed to remove the rebels from their base on Mount Ithome, in Messenia, they called for help from cities that were still part of the Hellenic League, an alliance formed in 481 BC against the Persians. The Spartans asked the Athenians for help due to the fact that Athenians had a reputation for being good at siege warfare. This spurred much debate among the Athenians as to how to respond. In August 463 BC, Ephialtes represented those who wished to refuse Sparta's request for military assistance in putting down a helot revolt. Cimon, the most influential Athenian politician and general of the time, was strongly pro-Spartan and advocated sending assistance, arguing that Athenians "ought not to suffer Greece to be lamed, nor their own city to be deprived of her yoke-fellow."  Ephialtes, meanwhile, argued that Sparta and Athens were natural rivals, and that Athens should rejoice at Sparta's misfortune rather than help the other city recover.  Cimon, however, was victorious in the debate, and set out for Sparta with 4,000 hoplites. However, shortly after the Athenians arrived to help the xenophobic Spartans, their assistance was turned down. Subsequently, harmony between Sparta and Athens was broken and Cimon was ostracized for his misjudgment. The end of Cimon's ascendancy resulted in the emergence of a more radical democratic movement led by Ephialtes

Attack on the Areopagus
At about this time, Ephialtes and his political allies began attacking the Areopagus, a council composed of former archons which was a traditionally conservative force.  According to Aristotle and some modern historians, Athens had, since about 470 BC, been governed under an informal "Areopagite constitution", under the leadership of Cimon. The Areopagus had already been losing prestige ever since 486 BC, since when archons were selected by lot. Ephialtes accelerated this process by prosecuting certain members for maladministration.<ref>Unless otherwise noted, all details of this campaign are drawn from Aristotle, Constitution of the Athenians, </ref>  Having thus weakened the prestige of the council, Ephialtes proposed and had passed in the popular assembly, a sweeping series of reforms which divided up the powers traditionally wielded by the Areopagus among the democratic council of the Boule, the ekklesia itself, and the popular courts. Ephialtes took away from the Areopagus their "additional powers, through which it had guardianship of the constitution."  The Areopagus merely remained a high court, in control of judging charges of murder and some religious matters.  Some historians have argued that Cimon and his hoplites were still in the Peloponnese at the time of this proposal, while others have argued that the proposal followed his return. Those who place the proposals during Cimon's absence suggest that he attempted to overturn them on his return, while those who believe he was present at the proposal believe that he opposed them in the initial debate.  All agree that his resistance was doomed to failure by the fact that his hoplite force had just been rudely dismissed by the Spartans, an action which demolished the political standing of Cimon and other pro-Spartan Athenians.

Death and legacy
The success of Ephialtes' reforms was rapidly followed by the ostracism of Cimon, which left Ephialtes and his faction firmly in control of the state, although the fully fledged Athenian democracy of later years was not yet fully established; Ephialtes' reforms appear to have been only the first step in the democratic party's programme.  Ephialtes, however, would not live to see the further development of this new form of government; In 461 BC, he was assassinated. The details of his assassination are unknown. However, there are several different theories to explain this event. The first source we have on Ephialtes himself and his death is Antiphon (5.68) written in 420 BC, which states that the identity of the murderer was unknown. “Thus those who murdered Ephialtes, one of your citizens, have never been discovered to this day, and if someone expected his associates to conjecture who were his [Ephialtes'] murderers, and if not, to be implicated in the murder, it would not have been fair to the associates. In addition, the murderers of Ephialtes did not desire to hide the body so there would be no danger of betraying the deed.” However 90 years later, Aristotle, in his Constitution of Athens 25.4, states that Aristodikos of Tanagra was the culprit. As the years progressed, more theories were established. A third idea is that Aristodikos of Tanagra was part of an oligarchic plot; his political ally Pericles would go on to complete the governmental transformation and lead Athens for several decades.  Had Ephialtes been murdered by somebody outside the radical faction, scholar Robert W. Wallace reasons, the radicals would have made him a martyr and led a crusade to find the perpetrator. This didn't happen, so the murderer likely came from within Ephialtes' own faction.

Literary references
The assassination of Ephialtes, and a subsequent murder investigation to find the men behind the plot, is the subject of a historical mystery novel, The Pericles Commission, by Gary Corby.

Notes

References

de Ste. Croix, G.E.M., The Origins of the Peloponnesian War, (Duckworth and Co., 1972) 
Hignett, Charles.  A History of the Athenian Constitution (Oxford, 1962) 
Hornblower, Simon, and Anthony Spawforth ed., The Oxford Classical Dictionary (Oxford University Press, 2003) 
Kagan, Donald. The Outbreak of the Peloponnesian War'' (Cornell, 1969). 

5th-century BC births
461 BC deaths
Ancient Greek statesmen
Ancient Athenian generals
5th-century BC Athenians
Ancient Greeks who were murdered
History of Classical Athens